How to Be Thirty is a South Korean streaming television series starring Jung In-sun, Kang Min-hyuk, Ahn Hee-yeon, Song Jae-rim, Cha Min-ji, Baek Sung-chul, and Kim Ji-sung. Based on the webtoon Something About 30 by Hye-won, it premiered on KakaoTV on February 23, 2021, with a new episode being released every Tuesday and Saturday at 17:00 (KST). The series has surpassed 13 million cumulative views as of just two weeks of airing.

Synopsis
How to Be Thirty tells the story of a group of friends in their early thirties.

Cast

Main
 Jung In-sun as Seo Ji-won
 Kwon Jung-eun as young Seo Ji-won
A 30-year-old webtoon artist who achieved success. Ran-joo and Ah-young are her best friends.
 Kang Min-hyuk as Lee Seung-yoo
 Kwon Yong-wook as young Lee Seung-yoo
A manager who is put in charge of editing Ji-won's webtoon. Seo Ji-won’s first love
 Ahn Hee-yeon as Lee Ran-joo
A 30-year-old news presenter. Ji-won and Ah-young are her best friends.
 Song Jae-rim as Cha Do-hoon
A film director who will direct a film based on one of Ji-won's webtoon.
 Cha Min-ji as Hong Ah-young
A 30-year-old café owner. Ji-won and Ran-joo are her best friends.
 Baek Sung-chul as Hyung Joon-young
A part-time employee at Ah-young's café.
 Kim Ji-sung as Lee Hye-ryung
Seung-yoo's girlfriend

Supporting
 Lee Chae-won as Yoon Sun-mi
 Ji-won's assistant
 Kim Min as Ms. Jung
 Ran-joo's co-worker
 Lee Kang-min as Kim Byung-ho
 Ah-young's ex-boyfriend
 Shim Tae-young as Kim Jin-woo
 Ji-won's ex-boyfriend

Special appearances
Kim Hyun-suk as man interested in Ran-joo #1 (Ep. 1)
Go Deok-won as man interesed in Ran-joo #2 (Ep. 1)
Yoon Deok-ki as man interesed in Ran-joo #3 (Ep. 1)
Lee Min-sung as man interesed in Ran-joo #4 (Ep. 1)
Choi Myung-ji as man interested in Ran-joo #5 (Ep. 1)
Lee Dong-won (Ep. 4)
Kwon Dong-ho as director (Ep. 3, 6, 12-13)
Hong Yi-hyun as Seung-yoo's co-worker #1 (Ep. 1-2, 12-13)
Choi Ji-won as Seung-yoo's co-worker #2 (Ep. 1, 3)
Song Gyo-hyun as Seung-yoo's co-worker #3 (Ep. 1, 3, 12)
Lee Jeong-hoon as Seung-yoo's co-worker #4 (Ep. 1, 3, 12)
Oh Tae-gon as Ran-joo co-worker #1 (Ep. 2, 6-7, 10, 13)
Oh Ji-yeong as Ran-joo co-worker #2 (Ep. 2, 6-7, 10, 13)
No Jong-sung (Ep. 3)
Jo Hye-won as announcer (Ep. 6)
Park Jeong-min (Ep. 6)
Yu Yeon-seok (Ep. 6)
Bae Ha-neul as Ran-joo's date (Ep. 7)
Seo Ji-mi as Ran-joo's personal trainer (Ep. 4, 9)
Kim Mi-na as Hye-ryeong's friend (Ep. 9, 12)

Episodes

Production

Development
In late August 2019, it was announced that the KakaoPage webtoon Born in 1985 by Hye-won would be adapted into a web series.

Casting
On August 11, 2020, Jung In-sun, Kang Min-hyuk, Ahn Hee-yeon and Song Jae-rim were confirmed to star in the series. Baek Sung-chul officially joined the cast on November 6, followed by Cha Min-ji on November 13.

Filming
Filming began in August 2020.

International broadcast
The series, titled as How to be Thirty, is available with multilingual subtitles on iQIYI (iQ.com) in South East Asia, Hong Kong, Macau and Taiwan.

It is available in the UK and Europe with community-generated subtitles on Viki (Viki.com)

References

External links
  
 
 
 

KakaoTV original programming
South Korean web series
2021 web series debuts
Television shows based on South Korean webtoons